Dil Yeh Ziddi Hai is an Indian drama series, produced by Viraj Kapur and Karan Raj Kohli of Manor rama pictures. It premiered on 12 November 2019 on Zee TV.  it replaced Rajaa Betaa. It stars Megha Ray and Shoaib Ali. The production of the show was abruptly stalled due to the COVID-19 outbreak in March 2020. it was later replaced by Kyun Rishton Mein Katti Batti in its timeslot.

Plot
The story of this show revolves around a girl Kajal Vyas (Megha Ray), who is suffering from a disease called Retinitis Pigmentosa. In this disease, the patient lost her eyesight. Kajal is very passionate about dancing. Kajal and Anshuman, her dance partner fall in love with each other. But Anshuman's elder sister Tanya does not like Kajal because she is not rich like them.

Cast

Main
 Megha Ray as Kajal Vyas
 Rohit Suchanti as Anshuman Sharma
 Shoaib Ali as Rochak Shivare

Recurring 
Sachin Khurana as Dr Anand Sharma - Anshuman's Father
 Darshan Pandya as Manu Bhargav - Kajal's Father 
Alisha Prajapati as Tanya Sharma -Anshuman's Sister
Pragati Mehta as Anshuman's Aunt 
Suruchi as Rashmi Vyas -Kajal's Mother 
Ruby Thakural as Kajal's Grandmother
Vrutansh Upadhyay as Parth Vyas- Kajal's Brother
Krishna Saajnani as Rajeev Vyas -Kajal's Mama
Payal Shukla as Sunheri Vyas-Kajal's Mami
Saurabh Sharma as Rochak's father
Shubhanshi Raghuvanshi as Riddhi
Hetal Yadav as Kamini Shivare-Rochak's mother
Manika Mehrotra as Riya -Anshuman's Cousin 
Anurag Vyas as Gaurav - Anshuman's Cousin 
Kiara Sadh as Baby Kajal Vyas 
Aahana Sharma as Sonia

Awards and nominations

References

2019 Indian television series debuts
Indian television soap operas
Zee TV original programming
Indian drama television series